Stewart Hill is an unincorporated community in Washington County, Tennessee, United States.

Notes

Unincorporated communities in Washington County, Tennessee
Unincorporated communities in Tennessee